Eric Douglas Saumarez, 7th Baron de Saumarez (born 13 August 1956), is a British hereditary peer.

Life
Born and brought up in Suffolk, Saumarez is the son of James Victor Broke Saumarez, 6th Baron de Saumarez, by his marriage to Joan Beryl Charlton. He was educated at Milton Abbey School in Dorset, the University of Nottingham, and the Royal Agricultural College, Cirencester.

He married, firstly, Christine Elizabeth Halliday, daughter of Bernard Neil Halliday, on 14 July 1982, and they had two children, Claire (born 23 February 1984) and Emily (born 14 June 1985). They were divorced in 1990. On 2 September 1991 Saumarez married secondly Susan Hearn, daughter of Joseph Hearn.

Also in 1991 Saumarez succeeded to the title of Baron de Saumarez, of Guernsey, and was a member of the House of Lords until it was reformed by the House of Lords Act 1999. In 2003 he was living at the family estate of Shrubland Park, Coddenham, but sold it in 2006. He later settled on the island of Guernsey, where his family originated.

Historical context
Baron de Saumarez, of the Island of Guernsey, is a title in the Peerage of the United Kingdom created on 15 September 1831 for the naval commander Admiral Sir James Saumarez, 1st Baronet. He was succeeded by his eldest son. James, the second Baron, a clergyman, who was succeeded by his younger brother, John, the third Baron.

The ancestral family seat was at Le Guet, Castel, on the island of Guernsey, with a second seat from 1882 at Shrubland Park, near Ipswich, Suffolk. Shrubland Park was sold by the present Lord de Saumarez in 2006 after the death of his mother. The Saumarez Manor estate in Guernsey belongs to a senior line of the family from which the Barons de Saumarez are descended: Matthew de Sausmarez (1718–1778), father of the first baron, was the younger brother of John (1706–1774), of Sausmarez Manor.

Arms

Sources
Kidd, Charles, Williamson, David (editors). Debrett's Peerage and Baronetage (1990 edition). New York: St Martin's Press, 1990.

References

1956 births
De Saumarez
Eldest sons of British hereditary barons
People educated at Milton Abbey School
Alumni of the University of Nottingham
Alumni of the Royal Agricultural University
Eric
English twins
Living people
People from Coddenham
de:Baron de Saumarez
de Saumarez